Benoist Apparu (born 24 November 1969) is a French politician of The Republicans who served as Secretary of State for Housing under the Minister of Ecology, Sustainable Development, Transport and Housing, Nathalie Kosciusko-Morizet, in the François Fillon III government, and a member of the National Assembly of France. He represented the Marne department,

Early life and education
Benoist Apparu was born on 24 November 1969 in Toulouse, Haute-Garonne, France. He holds a Master's degree in international law from University of Paris 1 Pantheon-Sorbonne.

Career
From 1994 to 1999, Apparu worked as a parliamentary assistant for Bruno Bourg-Broc. In 1996, he was elected as national representative for the young wing of the Rally for the Republic. From 1999 to 2002, he worked in the private sector. In 2001, he served as Deputy-Mayor of Châlons-en-Champagne for Youth and Communication, then for Housing in 2008, as Bruno Bourg-Broc was re-elected. He then worked as Chief of Staff for Xavier Darcos, and for Catherine Vautrin.

In 2007, Apparu was elected as a member of the National Assembly of France. His deputy is Bruno Bourg-Broc. On 23 June 2009 he was named Secretary of State for Housing and City in the François Fillon government, under the responsibility of Jean-Louis Borloo, Minister of the Environment. He was succeeded as MP by Lise Magnier.

Political positions
In January 2013, Apparu was one of the two UMP deputies, along with Franck Riester, to publicly declare his support and vote for a bill legalizing same-sex marriage in France which had been proposed by the government of Prime Minister Jean-Marc Ayrault.

References

1969 births
Living people
Politicians from Toulouse
Union for a Popular Movement politicians
The Republicans (France) politicians
Mayors of places in Grand Est
Deputies of the 13th National Assembly of the French Fifth Republic
Deputies of the 14th National Assembly of the French Fifth Republic
Pantheon-Sorbonne University alumni
Secretaries of State of France